This is a list of the National Register of Historic Places listings in Ochiltree County, Texas.

This is intended to be a complete list of properties and districts listed on the National Register of Historic Places in Ochiltree County, Texas. There are two properties listed on the National Register in the county.

Current listings

The publicly disclosed locations of National Register properties may be seen in a mapping service provided.

|}

See also

National Register of Historic Places listings in Texas
Recorded Texas Historic Landmarks in Ochiltree County

References

External links

Ochiltree County, Texas
Ochiltree County
Buildings and structures in Ochiltree County, Texas